Perry Township, Ohio may refer to:
Perry Township, Allen County, Ohio
Perry Township, Ashland County, Ohio
Perry Township, Brown County, Ohio
Perry Township, Carroll County, Ohio
Perry Township, Columbiana County, Ohio
Perry Township, Coshocton County, Ohio
Perry Township, Fayette County, Ohio
Perry Township, Franklin County, Ohio
Perry Township, Gallia County, Ohio
Perry Township, Hocking County, Ohio
Perry Township, Lake County, Ohio
Perry Township, Lawrence County, Ohio
Perry Township, Licking County, Ohio
Perry Township, Logan County, Ohio
Perry Township, Monroe County, Ohio
Perry Township, Montgomery County, Ohio
Perry Township, Morrow County, Ohio
Perry Township, Muskingum County, Ohio
Perry Township, Pickaway County, Ohio
Perry Township, Pike County, Ohio
Perry Township, Putnam County, Ohio
Perry Township, Richland County, Ohio
Perry Township, Shelby County, Ohio
Perry Township, Stark County, Ohio
Perry Township, Tuscarawas County, Ohio
Perry Township, Wood County, Ohio

See also
Perry Township (disambiguation)

Ohio township disambiguation pages